Adolf IV may refer to:

 Adolf IV, Count of Berg, count of Berg from 1132 until 1160
 Adolf IV of Holstein (before 1205 – 1261)
 Adolf IV of the Marck (1373–1448)